Agüeybaná may refer to:

Agüeybaná I (died 1510), Taíno cacique on Puerto Rico during Spanish contact
Agüeybaná II (1470 – 1511), or Güeybaná, Agüeybaná I's brother and successor who led the Taíno rebellion of 1511